By Myself is an LP album by Julie London, released by Liberty Records for Columbia House Record Club under catalog number MCR-1 as a monophonic recording and catalog number SCR-1 in stereo in 1965.

Track listing

 "You'd Be So Nice to Come Home To" - (Cole Porter) - 2:13
 "The Thrill Is Gone" - (Roy Hawkins, Rick Darnell) - 3:20
 "It Never Entered My Mind" - (Richard Rodgers, Lorenz Hart) - 2:25
 "Where or When" - (Richard Rodgers, Lorenz Hart) - 2:35
 "By Myself" - (Arthur Schwartz, Howard Dietz) - 4:12
 "They Can't Take That Away from Me" - (George Gershwin, Ira Gershwin) - 3:06
 "Love Is Here to Stay" - (George Gershwin, Ira Gershwin) - 3:17
 "Bewitched" - (Richard Rodgers, Lorenz Hart) - 2:54 
 "A Cottage for Sale" - (Willard Robison, Larry Conley) - 2:35
 "I Love Paris" - (Cole Porter) - 2:14

References

Liberty Records albums
1965 albums
Julie London albums